The Regatta at Aarhus University (also known as "the spring regatta" or "the boat race". In Danish "Kapsejlads") is an annual relay race held by members of Aarhus University on one of the lakes at the university park in Aarhus. The first regatta was held in 1991 and has been held annually since. The race is usually held the first Friday in May.

Every year, 12 teams participate, each team representing a department of the university, and each team consisting of five members (of which both genders must be represented). The goal of the race is to cross the lake in an inflatable item which the team brings themselves. Upon crossing, each participant must drink one beer, spin around the bottle ten times, and then cross back over the lake. Each of the team's five participants repeat this. The team spending least amount of time wins.

The winning team is rewarded the trophy "Det gyldne bækken" (lit. "the golden bedpan").

In recent years, the event has attracted approximately 25.000 spectators.

The Champions

Referencer

External links 

 Facebook page

Aarhus University
Sailing competitions in Denmark
Sport in Aarhus